The Burglarized Burglar is a 1911 silent film crime short directed by R. F. Baker(Richard Foster Baker) with Francis X. Bushman and Dorothy Phillips in the leads and an early role by later star Bryant Washburn. It was produced by the Essanay Studios(Chicago) and distributed by the General Film Company.

Cast
Francis X. Bushman - Howard Graham
Dorothy Phillips - Dorothy Willard
Bryant Washburn - The Burglar (?unconfirmed)
Harry Cashman - Mr. Willard
Eleanor Blanchard - Mrs. Willard
William Walters - Policeman

See also
Francis X. Bushman filmography

References

External links
 The Burglarized Burglar at IMDb.com

1911 films
American silent short films
1911 short films
Essanay Studios films
American crime films
1910s crime films
1910s American films